Mauro Pappacena (born 18 August 1958) is a former Italian male long-distance runner who competed at three editions of the IAAF World Cross Country Championships at senior level (1976, 1977, 1979).

References

External links
 Mauro Pappacena profile at Association of Road Racing Statisticians

1958 births
Living people
Italian male long-distance runners
Italian male cross country runners